Zir Rah (also Romanized as Zīr Rāh) is a village in Abolfares Rural District, in the Central District of Ramhormoz County, Khuzestan Province, Iran. At the 2006 census, its population was 146, in 29 families.

References 

Populated places in Ramhormoz County